Universal City is an unincorporated area within the San Fernando Valley region of Los Angeles County, California, United States. Approximately 415 acres (1.7 km) within and around the surrounding area is the property of Universal Pictures (NBCUniversal's film studio), one of the five major film studios in the United States: about 70 percent of the studio's property is inside this unincorporated area, while the remaining 30 percent is within the Los Angeles city limits. Universal City is primarily surrounded by Los Angeles with its northeastern corner touching the city of Burbank, making the unincorporated area a county island.

Located within the area of Universal City is the Universal Studios Hollywood film studio and theme park, as well as the Universal CityWalk shopping and entertainment center. Within the Los Angeles city limits lies 10 Universal City Plaza, a 36-floor office building for Universal and NBC; the Sheraton Universal; and the Universal Hilton. The Metro B Line underground station of the same name is located opposite the 10 Universal Plaza.

A Los Angeles County Sheriff's Department (LASD) station is located at Universal CityWalk, and the community also houses the only government-funded fire station in the United States located on private property. The Los Angeles County Fire Department (LACFD) Station 51 (formally Station 60 until the mid 1990s) is of special significance to Universal, as "Station 51" was the fictional setting of the Universal and Jack Webb television series Emergency!.  However, the current Station 51 was not used for external shots, or used as a model for the interior shots seen on the show (LACFD Station 127 in Carson was used).

Universal City's ZIP code is 91608, and the community is inside area code 818.

History

Carl Laemmle officially opened the Second Universal City (Lankershim Boulevard) on March 15, 1915, on the  Taylor Ranch property. At the launch event, in what is now the North Hollywood area, a crowd of men and women eagerly awaited the display of the film stages, daredevil stunt pilots and silent film idols, as well as the movie cameras Laemmle had brought along. "See how slapstick comedies are made. See your favorite screen stars do their work. See how we make the people laugh or cry or sit on the edge of their chairs the world over!" stated a poster touting Universal's opening. "C'mon out! Aw, c'mon!"

Laemmle, a German immigrant, was Universal Pictures' founder who opened his first nickelodeon in Chicago in 1906. He moved to New York City, where he soon joined half a dozen small motion picture companies to create the movie company he called Universal Pictures.

In 1912, Laemmle briefly operated three small studios -  Bison, Nestor, and Oak Crest Ranch. After a court battle with New York Motion Picture Company, control of the Bison lot was returned to the New York Motion Picture Company. The court allowed Carl Laemmle to retain use of the name "Bison" as "Bison 101" for his westerns, which were filmed on the Oak Crest property in the San Fernando Valley. The Oak Crest Ranch is where Laemmle filmed the western At Old Fort Dearborn. The Providencia Land and Water company, called "Oak Crest Ranch" in the trade papers, became the first Universal City location.

In 1913, Laemmle consolidated the Nestor studio (Hollywood) and Oak Crest ranch (Providencia) property. His first Universal City was too small, so he ordered a  search for a new and larger property in the valley, a location with more space. Laemmle leased Providencia ranchland in the San Fernando Valley in 1912. If it was a city, it was a haphazard one: with the help of nearly 300 movie hands and actors, Laemmle erected makeshift buildings, set up cameras and began churning out hundreds of one- and two-reel silent westerns.

Other studio chiefs called the place "Laemmle's Folly", mocking that the property was so far out of town and that Laemmle could film scenery for free anywhere he wanted. Laemmle worried that he had made a huge mistake, though Universal was a success because the public could observe movies being made.

In the meantime, Laemmle added a zoo to the Oak Crest Ranch, which was open to visitors to generate free advertising by word of mouth. The Rotarians of Los Angeles were one of the groups permitted to visit the Oak Crest - Universal City.

The Oak Crest ranch being too small for his larger Universal City, Laemmle bought the Lankershim Land and Water property, the  Taylor Ranch for $165,000, calling it his "New Universal City".

In 1914, operations at The Oak Ranch (Providencia Ranch) were moved to the Taylor (Lankershim) ranch. The Universal (Oak Crest) ranch zoo was moved to the Back Ranch of the Lankershim property. [Moving Picture World] The new Universal City was opened for Universal staff in 1914.

Laemmle went on an eight-day whistle-stop tour from Chicago to Los Angeles the week before Universal City's grand public opening. His promoters even sold the grand (and technically impossible) lie that Laemmle had persuaded the Secretary of the Navy to send a battleship up the Los Angeles River to fire a salvo on opening day. Easterners, they hoped, would believe anything they heard about California.

After World War I, Laemmle brought even more kin over from war-torn Europe, increasing the payroll to 70. His cheerful nepotism was immortalized in humorist Ogden Nash's couplet: Uncle Carl Laemmle has a very large faemmle. Carl Laemmle was responsible for creating the "star system" rather than just using anonymous actors in films.

Laemmle was forced to end studio tours in the 1920s, when talkies came along and "quiet on the set" became an absolute. He sold his sprawling entertainment empire in 1936. Before his death in 1939, at age 72, he helped bring more than 200 German-Jewish refugees to Los Angeles.

A nephew, Max, founded the local Laemmle Theatres chain.

Universal City did not welcome tourists again until July 15, 1964, with the opening of the Universal Studios Hollywood theme park and its included Studio Tour. The next few decades saw the arrival of hotels, an amphitheater, and Universal CityWalk (a faux city street and popular destination for tourists and locals).

Universal Ranch 1912
On April 30, 1912, Carl Laemmle merged the Independent Motion Picture Company with five smaller companies to form the Universal Film Manufacturing Company.  After visiting his newly acquired west coast operations of Nestor Studios and Nestor Ranch, he renamed the studio "Universal Studios" and the leased Oak Crest Ranch became the first "Universal City" in the San Fernando Valley. The first Universal/Nestor Ranch (Providencia Land and Water Development Company property Oak Crest Ranch) is presently the site of Forest Lawn Memorial Park (Hollywood Hills). In 1915, Universal moved its operations at the Hollywood/Nestor studio and Universal/Nestor Ranch to its new Lankershim Blvd. location before the official opening of Universal City (Lankershim Blvd). In 1916, the first Universal Oak Ranch became known as the Lasky Ranch. The Hollywood studio was then leased to Christie Comedies.

Universal City – Oak Crest Ranch (1912–1914)
In 1912, Carl Laemmle toured his Pacific Coast operations. He renamed the Nestor Studio "Universal Studios" and renamed the Providencia Ranch "Universal City."  Carl Laemmle thought the Providencia Ranch area was too small for his idea of "Universal City." He ordered the purchase of Lankershim land Water Company property.  Universal City moved to a new location,  the Taylor Ranch.

Lankershim Land and Water Company
They purchased lots 276, 277, 278; also a small portion of Lot 279, marked "Mary L. Carhart" (left side of the Lankershim bridge). Only  of the northern part of lot 278 became the official studios front lot in 1915.  The zoo and second open-air stage were constructed on the northern sections of lot 277 and 278. The mountain portions above  were not incorporated into studio use until MCA/Universal's master plan to level the hills and create the Universal Studio Tour Center and City Walk.

Universal City Ranch (Forest Lawn) moves
Between 1914 and 1915 "Universal City" assets were moved to the Lankershim location.

Forest Lawn Memorial Park (Hollywood Hills) history before 1917

The Providencia Land and Water Development Company property was used as a location for some early films, most significantly the battle scenes in the silent classic about the American Civil War, The Birth of a Nation (1915).

In 1912, Carl Laemmle (IMP) Universal Pictures took over the assets of Nestor Studios and named this area Universal City. The photograph of this area can be seen in Los Angeles Public Library archives: "A Birds Eye View of Universal City":
November 24, 1913 Bailey, Chas. Z. Universal City
1911 Nestor Filmmakers at the Forest Lawn Site
1911 Nestor Filmmakers at the Forest Lawn Site
1911 Nestor Sunset and Gower

Fires

More than a half-dozen major fires have impacted the Universal Studios property (and, accordingly, Universal City) during its history.

Climate

Government and infrastructure

Fire protection in Universal City is provided by the Los Angeles County Fire Department (LACFD). The LACFD operates Station #51 at 3900 Lankershim Boulevard as a part of Battalion 1.

The Los Angeles County Sheriff's Department (LASD) operates the West Hollywood Station in West Hollywood, serving Universal City. In addition, the department operates the substation at Universal CityWalk in Universal City. Prior to the summer of 1991, the West Hollywood Station handled all calls for police service from Universal City. In the summer of 1991, the LASD established the substation in a trailer in the parking lot of the studio tour and remained in the area until two years later, when the substation was moved into a permanent location in the CityWalk theme mall when it opened. The Los Angeles Police Department (LAPD) also shares jurisdiction with the LASD in providing protection to Universal City, operating the North Hollywood Community Police Station in North Hollywood, whose responsibilities include Universal City.

References

Universal City 1912 to 1914
 "San Fernando Valley" By Marc Wanamaker (2011)  Page 97, 103, and 106
  Early Hollywood Research Database - New York Dramatic Mirror - December 4, 1912
  Pacific Film Archive - Media History Digital Library -" The Moving PictureWorld" - Volume XVI April to June, 1913
  The Moving Picture World -  "UNIVERSAL CITY MOVES :  Movie Making locations by Jerry L. Schneider
  Early Universal City by Robert Birchard :  Arcadia Publishing
  Universal Weekly : "A Trip through the Home of Universal"  July 5, 1913, August 16, 1913, July 5, 1913
  Universal Weekly : "Universal City to be Moved to new Sites" March 28, 1914
 Universal Weekly : "Universal's Chameleon City"  and "Universal's Chameleon Studio Town"
 Universal Weekly : " Movie Actress Control Its Politic"  1913
 Universal Weekly : " Where Work Is Play and Play is Work" December 1913
 The Rotarian - Feb 1914 - Page 59 " Tour of the Oak Crest Ranch - the first Universal City
  Universal Weekly : "The New Universal City ," September, 1914
 "The Life and Adventures of Carl Laemmle" By John Drinkwater [Chapter IX Universal City]
 "Building Universal City" [October 3, 1914, The Moving Picture World] Movie Making locations by Jerry L. Schneider
 "Oak Crest," two  articles quoted  [The Moving Picture World]Movie Making locations by Jerry L. Schneider
 "Facts and Figures about Universal City" "Souvenir  Edition", 1915 Universal City Tour
 The Hollywood story By Joel Waldo Finler, Page 261 " The New Universal City .. in 1915"
 Bison Archives Collection Oak Crest Ranch images - Mark Wannamaker - interview on the first Universal City 1912 to 1914
 The Theatre of Science: a volume of progress and achievement in the motion picture industry by Robert Grau (1914) pages 51 and 287 [Providencia Ranch - Universal City Moves]

External links

 Oak Crest -Universal Ranch 1913

 
1915 establishments in California
Communities in the San Fernando Valley
Company towns in California
Populated places established in 1915
Unincorporated communities in California
Unincorporated communities in Los Angeles County, California
Universal Pictures
NBCUniversal